Vangelis is a Greek masculine given name. Notable people with the name include:

 Vangelis Alexandris, basketball coach and retired player
 Vangelis Georgiou (born 1988), Greek football left winger/back
 Vangelis Kazan (1930s–2008), Greek character actor
 Vangelis Meimarakis (born 1953), Greek lawyer and politician
 Vangelis Moras (born 1981), Greek football centre back
 Vangelis Ploios (born 1937), Greek theatrical, film and television actor
 Vangelis Sklavos (born 1977), Greek basketball player
 Vangelis Vlachos (born 1962), Greek football midfielder

See also
 Evangelos (Ευάγγελος), a common Greek name and root for Vangelis

Greek masculine given names